The Spur Posse was a group of high school boys from Lakewood, California, who used a point system to keep track of and compare their sexual attacks and statutory rapes. 

The founder of the group chose the name "Spur Posse" when a favorite basketball player of theirs, David Robinson, signed with the San Antonio Spurs. 

The group came to national attention on March 18, 1993, when the Los Angeles County Sheriff's Department arrested a number of the members for various sexual crimes. Prosecutors later dropped all but one of the charges after being unable to prove most of the encounters were nonconsensual, although many were with underage girls, some as young as ten. 

One girl who was later interrogated by police said she had been in bed late one night when a teenager appeared at her window and demanded sex from her. She complied because of rumors that the Spurs would harm women who resisted. 

Police had the opportunity to prosecute the considerably older boys for statutory rape, but declined to do so.

Members of the Spur Posse proceeded to make the rounds on the tabloid-TV talk-show circuit.

In popular culture
The main villains in the 1999 horror film The Rage: Carrie 2 were based on the Spur Posse.

They are mentioned in the Bratmobile song "Brat Girl."

They are mentioned in Joan Didion's Where I Was From.

The Spur Posse was covered at length in Susan Faludi's book Stiffed: The Betrayal of the American Man, including their formation, their fame and appearance on talk shows, and the aftermath, in which members found themselves shunned by their community and unable to find employment because of their infamy.

They are the subject of Joan Didion's Trouble in Lakewood, "Letter from California" July 26, 1993 Issue of The New Yorker.

In 1995, Law & Order broadcast an episode, "Performance", based upon the case.

The X Files mentions them in an episode, "Red Museum" with the throw away line "I think the Spur Posse just rode into town."

Hugo Bonnard is currently writing a book on them entitled  How many points?: A tale of Women's survivals.

References

 .
 .
 .
 .
 .
 .
 .
 .
 .

See also 
Steubenville High School rape case

1993 controversies
Sexuality in the United States
Lakewood, California
Social groups
Child sexual abuse in the United States